ABU Song Festival may refer to:

 ABU Song Festivals, two song festivals organised by the Asia-Pacific Broadcasting Union (ABU)
 ABU Radio Song Festival, a biennial radio festival organised by the Asia-Pacific Broadcasting Union
 ABU TV Song Festival, an annual television gala song festival organised by the Asia-Pacific Broadcasting Union